Waurn Ponds is a mainly residential southern suburb of Geelong, Victoria, Australia.

The suburb is bounded by Rossack Drive, Princes Highway, the Geelong to Warrnambool railway, Reservoir Road, Draytons Road, Pigdons Road, Deakin University and Honeys Road. It is home to the main Geelong campus of Deakin University and the regional Waurn Ponds Shopping Centre. There are many schools around Waurn Ponds like Mount Duneed Regional Primary School.

History

The town was named after the Waurn chain of ponds, a watercourse that flows from Mount Moriac over 30 km into the Barwon River.

'Waurn' meaning "place of many houses" in reference to aboriginal stone houses in the Wathaurong language.

Two early hotels - the Victoria Inn (1845–60) and the Waurn Ponds Inn (1856) were located on the Princes Highway serving travellers on the road. The Albert and Victoria vineyards, owned by David Pettavel, began growing grapes in 1848 and the area was better known as Pettavel in the 1860s. The Pettavel Post Office opened on 12 January 1865 and remained open until 1952. The Waurn Ponds Post Office opened on 1 December 1871 and closed in 1968.

A quarry for limestone was opened in the 1840s, with quarrying continuing from 1964 to today at the nearby Blue Circle Southern cement works. Kilns for making mortar lime operated until the 1970s.

Waurn Ponds Memorial Reserve 

The Waurn Ponds Memorial Reserve (Formally Waurn Ponds Aveneu of Honour) is located on the Corner of Cochranes Road and Waurn Ponds Drive, Waurn Ponds. The Aveneu of Honour was planted in July 1919, by the  residents of Waurn Ponds as a tribute to the Waurn Ponds World War One Servicemen.

In 1999, the Victorian State Government decided to sell the Avenue of Honour. Local residents and the Victorian RSL President Bruce Ruxton campaigned that the Aveneu of Honour would not be auctioned and that the site be protected. The Victorian State Government overturned the sale of the Waurn Ponds Memorial Reserve and a Committee of Management was appointed with Mr Jack Harriott been the Chair.

A re dedication service was held with a plaque listing the Waurn Ponds W.W.1 Servicemen unveiled. In 2000, another two plaques were added with additional Waurn Ponds Servicemen who served in World War One and another plaque honouring the Waurn Ponds Servicemen and Servicewomen who served in the Second World War.

Today there are plaques acknowledging those that served in the Korean War, Vietnam War, Royal Australian Air Force Nurses and Servicewomen from the Geelong area. The Memorial Reserve is also home to the 3.7 Anti Aircraft Gun which is on display at the Reserve.
An annual memorial service is held on the first Sunday of July to mark the anniversary of the Waurn Ponds Memorial Reserve.

Waurn Ponds Hall 

The Waurn Ponds Hall which is located on 225 Waurn Ponds Drive was erected in 1924as mechanics institute and free library. The Hall is now used for many local events and can be hired for private functions. The back of the Waurn Ponds Hall was the original Waurn Ponds State School which was relocated to Grovedale Primary School and later back to the Waurn Ponds Hall as an extension.

Waurn Ponds started to become part of the outer suburbs of Geelong from the 1970s, with the opening of the Deakin University campus and the Waurn Ponds Hotel on the highway. Major development did not begin until the early 1990s, based around Ghazeepore Road. The intervening years have seen housing developments spread across the hillside towards Grovedale.

Heritage listed sites

Waurn Ponds contains a number of heritage listed sites, including:

 Princes Highway and 110 Lemins Road, Lime Burning Kiln
 Princes Highway, Waurn Ponds Creek Bridge

Geography

Waurn Ponds is home to the quite small Waurn Ponds Creek. It starts around the Mount Moriac region and eventually flows into the Barwon River near Belmont Common.

As of 2007, it is low on water and is no more than 1 meter deep in most sections. It has a large weed problem which makes the creek look uninhabitable. The creek is home to species of fish (many introduced) including Carp, Redfin, Roach, Tench, Australian Grayling and short finned eels. The creek also is a large habitat of native birds including the pacific black duck. Increase in annual rain will bring the creek back to its original status.

Community groups 

The Friends of the Waurn Ponds Creek is a community group that gather on the first and third Sunday of the month to protect and conserve the health of the Waurn Ponds Creek and surrounding area. The Friends first started in 2002 and have won awards for their dedication and work towards enhancing the creek to protect the native fish and wildlife that habitat are along the creek. The Friends plant tress, clean up rubbish and maintain weeds and tree planting sites.

Waurn Ponds has a large linear parkland following the creek. The neighbouring suburb of Grovedale has a skate park and baseball complex.

Waurn Ponds has a Hall, Tennis Club, Cricket Club and Memorial Reserve to the west of Waurn Ponds.

The Waurn Ponds Tennis Club located on 20 Belperroud Road off Waurn Ponds Drive, is a successful tennis club which has junior and senior competitions in the Tennis Geelong Competition.

The Waurn Ponds Cricket Club located on Waurn Ponds Drive, access from Deskin University was established in 1986 and currently has senior men's team and junior sides. The Club is in the Geelong Cricket Assoctiation.

The boundaries of Waurn Ponds were expanded in 2012 when, as a result of boundary changes related to the development of the nearby Armstrong Creek Growth Area, an area of land in the west of the current suburb between the Princes Highway and the Geelong-Warrnambool railway line was shifted from the locality of Mount Duneed to Waurn Ponds.

Transport 

Waurn Ponds is located on the Princes Highway that links the suburb with the centre of Geelong. It is also the southern endpoint of the Geelong Ring Road, completed in 2009. Anglesea Road heads south through the suburb, linking the area to Torquay and Anglesea. Pioneer Road links the region west to Grovedale, the road not being completed eastward across the Waurn Ponds Creek until the mid-1990s.

Public transport to the area is provided by buses operated by CDC Geelong and McHarry's Buslines, under contract to Public Transport Victoria. Routes to the Geelong city centre originate and terminate at Deakin University.
 Route 1 - Deakin University to North Shore and return, via Grovedale, Belmont, South Geelong railway station, Geelong, Geelong West and North Geelong - runs every 20 minutes on weekdays and every 30 minutes on weekends. There is a train station running from Melbourne to Warnambol and waurn ponds is one of the stops
 Route 40 - Deakin University to Geelong railway station and return, via Grovedale, Waurn Ponds Shopping Centre, Marshall railway station, Breakwater and East Geelong - runs hourly on weekdays but does not run on weekends.
 Route 41 - Deakin University to Geelong railway station and return, via Waurn Ponds railway station, Grovedale, Waurn Ponds Plaza, Waurn Ponds Shopping Centre, Belmont and South Geelong - runs every 30 minutes on weekdays and hourly on weekends.
 Route 42 - Deakin University to Geelong railway station and return, via Waurn Ponds railway station, Grovedale, Waurn Pond Shopping Centre, Highton, Belmont and South Geelong - runs every 20 minutes on weekdays and hourly on weekends.
 Route 43 - Deakin University to Geelong Railway station and return, via Highton and Newtown - runs every 40 minutes on weekdays and hourly on weekends.

The Geelong V/Line rail service, to and from Geelong and Melbourne, was extended to the new Waurn Ponds railway station, situated in Sugargum Drive, in 2014. The new station was named Grovedale in the planning stages, despite being physically located in Waurn Ponds, but the official name of Waurn Ponds was announced in July 2014.

An earlier extension of Geelong line rail services in the direction of Waurn Ponds had been considered when funding was set aside for a new station beyond South Geelong station in 2003-04, but that eventually resulted in the new station being built at Marshall, closer to Geelong, instead.

University

The Deakin University campus at Waurn Ponds had the beginnings in the Gordon Institute of TAFE, who purchased land there in 1969. A building for the Applied Sciences was first built, followed by a library and student lodgings in 1975. In 1976 the Gordon Institute was divided into two parts, with academic courses becoming part of the newly formed Deakin University based at the Waurn Ponds campus.

Deakin enrolled its first students at its Waurn Ponds campus in 1977. Today the university is located on a  site, has over 1,000 staff and over 4000 on-campus students.

Deakin offers many social groups for students to join, The main Association is DUSA, followed closely by the Deakin Students' Commerce Society Deakin University Student Association#Deakin Commerce Students' Society

Retail

The Waurn Ponds Shopping Centre, located on the corner of Colac Road (Princes Highway) and Pioneer Road, is a regional-level shopping centre servicing the southern suburbs of Geelong and the surrounding region. It was opened in the early 1990s, and has been continually expanded. The most recent expansion was completed in August 2014, and increased the total area of the centre to 47,000 square metres. There are over 160 different shops.

The Geelong Homemaker Centre, located on the Colac Road (Princes Highway) at the intersection and Pigdons Road, opened in mid-2005. It includes Bunnings Warehouse and Harvey Norman stores, as well as a number of smaller stores, such as Supercheap Auto, Beacon Lighting, Snooze, Ray's Outdoors and, most recently, JB-Hi-Fi.

Waurn Ponds Plaza, located at the intersection of Rossack Drive and the Colac Road (Princes Highway), is another shopping centre in Waurn Ponds. It is the location of the office of the federal member for Corangamite, Libby Coker.

See also
 Geelong Ring Road
 Grovedale

References

External links
 Victorian Places: Waurn Ponds

Suburbs of Geelong
Lime kilns in Australia